The 2017 Northeast Conference women's basketball tournament was held from March 5–8, 2017. The tournament featured  the league's top eight seeds, with the higher seed hosting games. Robert Morris won their second consecutive NEC Tournament Championship and seventh overall.

Format
For the thirteenth straight year, the NEC Women’s Basketball Tournament consists of an eight-team playoff format with all games played at the home of the higher seed. LIU Brooklyn and Wagner were the bottom two teams left out of the Tournament. After the quarterfinals, the teams will be reseeded so the highest remaining seed plays the lowest remaining seed in the semifinals.

Seeds

Bracket

All games will be played at the venue of the higher seed

All-tournament team
Tournament MVP in bold.

References

 
Northeast Conference women's basketball tournament
Northeast Conference women's basketball tournament